Baby Pop is the fifth album by French singer France Gall and she is accompanied by Alain Goraguer and His Orchestra. It was released in October 1966.

Track listing

References

France Gall albums
Philips Records albums
1966 albums